Andreas Høy (born 1817, date of death unknown) was a Norwegian politician.

He was elected to the Norwegian Parliament in 1859, representing the constituency of Stavanger. He worked as a merchant in that city. He only sat one term.

On the local level he was mayor of Stavanger in 1863.

References

1817 births
Year of death missing
Members of the Storting
Politicians from Stavanger
Mayors of places in Rogaland